Jarret Eaton (born June 24, 1989) is an American track and field athlete, known for running hurdles. He won the silver medal in the 60 metre hurdles at the 2018 World Indoor Championships while being coached by Lawrence Terry, and took a bronze in 2022.

Eaton was the 2016 and 2018 American champion in the 60 metre hurdles.  That qualified him to run in the 2016 World Indoor Championships in Portland, where he finished fourth.  He returned to the 2018 World Championships in Birmingham, taking the silver medal, after leading the race until hitting the final hurdle, behind Britain's Andrew Pozzi and ahead of France's Aurel Manga. While running for Syracuse University, he was the 2012 NCAA Indoor Champion in the same event.

The then 32-year-old returned in 2022 to the World Indoor Championships in Belgrade, and won the bronze medal for the 60m hurdles, behind compatriot Grant Holloway and France's Pascal Martinot-Lagarde.

Jarret has a personal best of 13.25 for 110m hurdles outdoors and for the 60m hurdles indoors his personal best is 7.43 set at the 2018 US Indoor T&F Championships defeating 2012 Olympic Champion and outdoor hurdle world record holder Aries Merritt.

Eaton is represented by sports agent Mark Pryor of World Express Sports Management

References

External links

Living people
1989 births
American male hurdlers
Athletes (track and field) at the 2019 Pan American Games
Pan American Games track and field athletes for the United States
Pan American Games bronze medalists for the United States
Pan American Games medalists in athletics (track and field)
USA Indoor Track and Field Championships winners
Medalists at the 2019 Pan American Games
World Athletics Indoor Championships medalists